József Szendi (31 October 1921 – 23 July 2017) was a Hungarian prelate of the Roman Catholic Church.

Biography
Szendi was born in Székesfehérvár, Hungary and was ordained a priest on 24 December 1944. From 1969 until 1982, he was spiritual of the seminary of Esztergom. Szendi was appointed Apostolic Administrator of the Archdiocese of Veszprém as well as Titular bishop of  Stephaniacum on 5 April 1982 and was consecrated bishop on 21 April 1982 by Laszlo Paskai. He was appointed archbishop of the Archdiocese of Veszprém on 3 September 1983 and served until retiring on 14 August 1997.

References

External links
Catholic-Hierarchy

1921 births
2017 deaths
20th-century Roman Catholic bishops in Hungary
People from Székesfehérvár
Archbishops of Veszprém
Bishops of Veszprém